Hecistopteris is a fern genus in the Vittarioideae subfamily of the Pteridaceae.

Species
The genus Hecistopteris contains the following species:

 Hecistopteris kaieteurensis Kelloff & G.S.McKee
 Hecistopteris pinnatifida R.C.Moran & B.Øllg.
 Hecistopteris pumila (Spreng.) J.Sm. – moss fern

References

Pteridaceae
Fern genera
Taxonomy articles created by Polbot